The 1999 IGA SuperThrift Tennis Classic was a women's tennis tournament played on indoor hard courts at The Greens Country Club in Oklahoma City, Oklahoma in the United States that was part of Tier III of the 1999 WTA Tour. It was the 14th edition of the tournament and was held from February 22 through February 28, 1999. First-seeded Venus Williams won her second consecutive singles title at the event and earned $27,000 first-prize money. On the same day her sister Serena won the Open Gaz de France tournament, making them the first sisters to win WTA events in the same week.

Finals

Singles

 Venus Williams defeated  Amanda Coetzer, 6–4, 6–0
 It was Williams' 2nd singles title of the year and the 4th of her  career.

Doubles

 Lisa Raymond /  Rennae Stubbs defeated  Amanda Coetzer /  Jessica Steck, 6–3, 6–4

Entrants

Seeds

Other entrants
The following players received wildcards into the singles main draw:
  Alexandra Stevenson
  Lori McNeil

The following players received wildcards into the doubles main draw:
  Amanda Coetzer /  Jessica Steck

The following players received entry from the singles qualifying draw:

  Lilia Osterloh
  Mashona Washington
  Nana Miyagi
  Nicole Pratt

The following players received entry from the doubles qualifying draw:

  Annabel Ellwood /  Brie Rippner

References

External links
 ITF tournament edition details
 Tournament draws

IGA SuperThrift Classic
U.S. National Indoor Championships
IGA SuperThrift Tennis Classic
IGA SuperThrift Tennis Classic
IGA SuperThrift Tennis Classic